The 1995–96 Sportstar YUBA League was the 4th season of the YUBA League, the top-tier professional basketball league in Yugoslavia (later renamed to Serbia and Montenegro).

Regular season

Group One

Group Two

Group Three

Group Four

Second stage 
Results from the regular season were transcluded.

Championship League

Consolation League

Playoffs

Finals 
Source

|}

Clubs in European competitions

See also 
 1995–96 ACB season
 1995–96 Slovenian Basketball League

References

1995–96 in Yugoslav basketball
YUBA